Christianity is the largest religion in Cape Verde, with Roman Catholics having the most adherents. Different sources give varying estimates on the relative sizes of various Christian denominations. More than 93% of the population of Cape Verde is Christian, with almost 80% being Roman Catholic, according to an informal poll taken by local churches. About 5% of the population is Protestant. The largest Protestant denomination is the Church of the Nazarene.  Other groups include the Seventh-day Adventist Church, the Church of Jesus Christ of Latter-day Saints, the Assemblies of God, the Universal Church of the Kingdom of God, the New Apostolic Church and various other Pentecostal and evangelical groups.

There is a small Baháʼí Faith community and a small Muslim community. The number of atheists is estimated at less than 1 percent of the population.

There is no association between religious differences and ethnic or political affiliations; however, the Catholic hierarchy is sympathetic to the Movement for Democracy (MPD) party, which ruled the country from 1991 to 2001. While many Catholics once were hostile toward the African Party for the Independence of Cape Verde (PAICV), which became the governing party in 2001, some have become supporters of the PAICV due to conflict within the MPD party and dissatisfaction over the latter's performance.

There are foreign missionary groups operating in the country. The Constitution provides for freedom of religion, and the Government generally respects this right in practice. The US government received no reports of societal abuses or discrimination based on religious belief or practice.

See also 

Outline of Cape Verde
Index of Cape Verde–related articles
Islands of Macaronesia
Azores
Canary Islands
Madeira
 Christianity in Cape Verde
 Roman Catholicism in Cape Verde
 Islam in Cape Verde
 Freedom of religion in Cape Verde
 The Church of Jesus Christ of Latter-day Saints in Cape Verde

References